Xavier Review is a humanities journal published at Xavier University in Louisiana and the oldest American literary journal based at an historically black college. Xavier Review was founded in 1980. Two issues are published each year.

Editors
The current editor is poet Ralph Adamo. Previous editors include Nicole Pepinster Greene, Richard Collins, Thomas Bonner, Jr. and Charles Fort.
Founded by critic Thomas Bonner and poet Charles Fort.
The managing editor is Katheryn Laborde.

Contributors
Among its early contributors were Alex Haley, Houston Baker, Walker Percy and Ernest Gaines.  More recent contributors of note include poets Richard Spilman and James Doyle, and fiction writer Jacob M. Appel.

See also
List of literary magazines

References

External links
 

1980 establishments in Louisiana
Biannual magazines published in the United States
Louisiana culture
Magazines established in 1980
Magazines published in Louisiana
Mass media in New Orleans
Poetry magazines published in the United States